The Honda Bravo is a four-stroke  underbone class motorcycle designed and manufactured in the Philippines. The frame and engine of the Honda Bravo is the same as the Honda Wave 100 of Thailand, and they differ only in the plastic body fairings. This motorcycle is related to the Honda XRM, which is also designed and manufactured in the Philippines. It uses an aluminium engine.

External links
Honda Philippines Bravo Website

Honda motorcycles
Motorcycles introduced in 2006